This is a list of vice presidents of the Philippines by place of primary affiliation. Some vice presidents have been born in one province, but are commonly associated with another.

Provinces of primary affiliation

Provinces of primary affiliation by vice president

Vice presidents by province of primary affiliation

Places of birth

Vice presidents by province of birth

Vice presidents who did not primarily reside in their respective birth provinces
As of 2016, 3 out of 13 (accounting for Fernando Lopez' two non-consecutive terms) individuals (23%) were inaugurated after officially residing in a different place than their birth.

Notes and references

See also
 List of presidents of the Philippines by province

Philippines 
Vice-Presidents